Alliant may refer to:
Alliant Aviation, an American aircraft manufacturer based in Three Rivers, Michigan and later in Richland, Michigan
Alliant Destiny Fusion, an American powered parachute design
Alliant Destiny XLT, an American powered parachute design
Alliant Computer Systems, an American computer company that designed and manufactured parallel computing systems
Alliant Credit Union, a Chicago-based financial cooperative
Alliant Energy, an American public utility holding company that incorporated in Madison, Wisconsin in 1981
Alliant Energy Center, an American multi-building complex in Madison, Wisconsin
Alliant Exchange, Inc, an American food service company
Alliantgroup, an American tax consulting services firm based in Houston, Texas
Alliant International University an American private, higher education institution based in San Diego, California
Alliant Techsystems, an American aerospace, defense, and sporting goods company based in Arlington County, Virginia
Alliant RQ-6 Outrider, an American unmanned aerial vehicle